Ripon is a municipality in Papineau Regional County Municipality in the Outaouais region of western Quebec, Canada. It is located in the valley of the Petite-Nation River.

The town was named after Ripon in North Yorkshire, England.

Demographics

References

External links

Town web site

Municipalities in Quebec
Incorporated places in Outaouais
Designated places in Quebec